Ghaziabad Airport  is a public use airport located near Ghaziabad, Nangarhar, Afghanistan.

See also
List of airports in Afghanistan

References

External links 
 Airport record for Ghaziabad Airport at Landings.com. Retrieved 2013-8-1

Airports in Afghanistan
Nangarhar Province